William Calhoun or Bill Calhoun may also refer to:

 Haystack Calhoun (1934–1989), a wrestler 
WC (rapper) (William L. Calhoun, Jr., born 1970), West Coast rapper
William Lowndes Calhoun (1837–1908), American attorney and politician from the state of Georgia who served as Mayor of Atlanta
William B. Calhoun (1796–1865), U.S. Representative from Massachusetts
Bill Calhoun (basketball) (born 1927), American former professional basketball player
Bill Calhoun (baseball) (1890–1955), American professional baseball player
William F. Calhoun, state legislator in Illinois
William Henry Calhoun, American silversmith
William L. Calhoun (admiral) (1884–1963), U.S. Navy
William J. Calhoun (1848–1916), American attorney, government official, and friend of President William McKinley
Will Calhoun (born 1964), American drummer
Bill Calhoun, a secondary lead character in the Broadway musical Kiss Me, Kate